The National Academy of Sciences is a United States nonprofit, non-governmental national academy.

National Academy of Sciences may also refer to (ordered by country):

 National Academy of Sciences of Argentina
 Armenian National Academy of Sciences
 Azerbaijan National Academy of Sciences
 National Academy of Sciences of Belarus
 Georgian National Academy of Sciences
 Indian National Science Academy
 National Academy of Sciences, India
 National Academy of Sciences of the Republic of Korea
 National Academy of Sciences of Ukraine
 Uganda National Academy of Sciences

See also
Academy of sciences#List